NARCIS (National Academic Research and Collaboration Information System) of the Netherlands is an online portal for searching Dutch scientific research publications and data. As of July 2018, NARCIS indexes 268,989 data sets and 1,707,486 publications, including a significant proportion of open access works. 

It started in 2004 as a project of the Koninklijke Nederlandse Akademie van Wetenschappen, Information Centre of the Radboud University of Nijmegen (METIS), Nederlandse Organisatie voor Wetenschappelijk Onderzoek, and Vereniging van Universiteiten.

See also
 Open access in the Netherlands

References

This article incorporates information from the Dutch Wikipedia.

Further reading

External links
 Official site
  (includes NARCIS)

Science and technology in the Netherlands
2004 establishments in the Netherlands
Dutch digital libraries
Open access (publishing)
Online databases